Wu Pang (1909–2000) was a Hong Kong Chinese director, producer, production manager, actor, movie planner, writer and the co-founder of the Yong Yao Film Company.

Early life 
On December 21, 1909, Wu was born in Shanghai, Republic of China.

Career 
Wu and producer Zhenjiang Yongyao started making films in 1938. At the age of 30, Wu began making films of folk hero Wong Fei Hung which starred actor and martial artist Kwan Tak-hing, also known as Kwan Te-hsing by film producer Raymond Chow Man Wai. Over the course of his life, Wu directed nearly 200 movies and received the Lifetime Achievement Awards by the Hong Kong Film Critics' Association in 1999.

Books 
Wu also published a book, Wong Fei Hung and I, about his extensive work on the subject.

Filmography

Films 
This is a partial list of films.
 1938 A Night of Romance, A Lifetime of Regret
 1948 Fishing Village in the War
 1949 The Story of Wong Fei-Hung (Part 1)
 1950 How Shaolin Monastery Was Reduced to Ashes 
 1955 Story of Iron Monkey (Grand Finale) 
 1956 Iron-Palm Versus Eagle-Claw 
 1956 How Wong Fei-hung Subdued the Two Tigers 
 1957 How Wong Fei-Hung Fought a Bloody Battle in the Spinster's Home 
 1959 Wong Fei-Hung on Rainbow Bridge 
 1960 Two Orphans Conquered the Dragon at Tianshan 
 1961 Decisive Battle at Nan Ling Temple 
 1961 How Wong Fei-Hung Smashed the Five Tigers 
 1964 Sword of the Buddha's Warrior 
 1969 The Flying Swordgirl
 1980 Luckiest Trio

Awards 
 1999 Lifetime Achievement Award. Presented by Hong Kong Film Critics’ Association.
 Star. Avenue of Stars. Tsim Sha Tsui waterfront in Hong Kong.

Personal life 
In 1936, at age 27, Wu moved to Hong Kong.
In 2000, Wu died in the Hong Kong Health Centre at the age of 91.

See also 
 Wong Fei Hung Filmography
 Avenue of Stars, Hong Kong

References

External links 
 Wu Pang at imdb.com
 Wu Pang at hkmdb.com

1909 births
2000 deaths
Hong Kong male actors
Hong Kong film directors
People from Shanghai
Chinese emigrants to British Hong Kong